This is a list of VTV dramas released in 2011.

←2010 - 2011 - 2012→

VTV Tet dramas

VTV1
These dramas air from 20:05 to 20:55 on VTV1 during the period of Tet.

VTV3
These dramas air on VTV3 during the period of Tet.

VTV1 Weeknight Prime-time dramas

Monday-Wednesday dramas
These dramas air from 20:05 to 20:55, Monday to Wednesday on VTV1.

Thursday-Friday dramas
These dramas air from 20:05 to 20:55, Thursday and Friday on VTV1.

VTV3 Weeknight Prime-time dramas

Monday-Wednesday dramas
These dramas air from 21:10 to 22:00, Monday to Wednesday on VTV3.

Thursday-Friday dramas
These dramas air from 21:10 to 22:00, Thursday and Friday on VTV3.

VTV3 Rubic 8 dramas
These dramas air from 14:30 to 15:15, Saturday and Sunday on VTV3 as a part of the program Rubic 8.

See also
 List of dramas broadcast by Vietnam Television (VTV)
 List of dramas broadcast by Hanoi Radio Television (HanoiTV)
 List of dramas broadcast by Vietnam Digital Television (VTC)

References

External links
VTV.gov.vn – Official VTV Website 
VTV.vn – Official VTV Online Newspaper 

Vietnam Television original programming
2011 in Vietnamese television